Stephen Emt (born January 6, 1970) is an American wheelchair curler.

Career
He represented the United States at the 2018 Winter Paralympics and 2022 Winter Paralympics where they finished in twelfth and fifth places respectively.

Teams

References

External links 

Steve EMT - Athlete Profile - World Para Nordic Skiing - Live results | International Paralympic Committee
Steve Emt - The Decision Catalyst Speaker
Ryan Martin's Musings - Q&A with Paralympic Curler, Steve Emt
Steve Emt, Curling His Way to South Korea - UConn Magazine
 

 Video: 

Living people
1970 births
People from Manchester, Connecticut
American male curlers
American disabled sportspeople
American wheelchair curlers
Paralympic wheelchair curlers of the United States
Wheelchair curlers at the 2018 Winter Paralympics
Wheelchair curlers at the 2022 Winter Paralympics